Shorea is a genus of about 196 species of mainly rainforest trees in the family Dipterocarpaceae. The genus is named after Sir John Shore, the governor-general of the British East India Company, 1793–1798. The timber of trees of the genus is sold under the common names lauan, luan, lawaan, meranti, seraya, balau, bangkirai, and Philippine mahogany.

Taxonomy 
Shorea fossils (linked with the modern sal, S. robusta, which is still a dominant tree species in Indian forests) are known from as early as the Eocene of Gujarat, India. They are identifiable by the amber fossils formed by their dammar resin. Other fossils include a Miocene-aged fossilized fruit from the same region; this fruit most closely resembles the extant S. macroptera of the Malay Peninsula.

Description 
Shorea spp. are native to Southeast Asia, from northern India to Malaysia, Indonesia, and the Philippines. In west Malesia and the Philippines, this genus dominates the skyline of the tropical forests. The tallest documented tropical angiosperm is an  Shorea faguetiana found in the Danum Valley Conservation Area, in Sabah, Malaysia (Borneo). And in the Tawau Hills National Park, in Sabah on the island of Borneo at least five other species of the genus have been measured to be over 80 m tall: S. argentifolia, S. gibbosa, S. johorensis, S. smithiana, and S. superba. Borneo is also the hotspot of Shorea diversity with 138 species, of which 91 are endemic to the island.

Sections and selected species 

Anthoshorea
 Shorea agamii P.S.Ashton
Brachypterae
 Shorea smithiana Symington
Doona
 Shorea zeylanica (Thwaites) P.S.Ashton
Mutica
 Shorea argentifolia Symington
 Shorea parvifolia Dyer
Neohopea
 Shorea isoptera P.S.Ashton
Ovalis
 Shorea ovalis (Korth.) Blume
Pachycarpae
 Shorea macrophylla (de Vriese) P.S.Ashton
Pentacme
 Shorea siamensis Miq.
Richetioides
 Shorea richetia Symington
Rubella
 Shorea albida Symington
Shorea
 Shorea guiso (Blanco) Blume
Not placed
 Shorea robusta C.F.Gaertn. (sal tree)
 Shorea thorelii Pierre ex Laness.

Reproductive biology
The majority of Shorea spp. are general flowering species, which is an event that occurs at irregular intervals of 3–10 yr, in which nearly all dipterocarp species together with species of other families bloom heavily. General flowering is thought to have evolved to satiate seed predators and/or to facilitate pollination. Both explanations apparently hold merit. Flowering is thought to be triggered by droughts that occur during transition periods from La Niña to El Niño. The magnitude of a flowering event is suggested to be dependent on the timing of the droughts associated with the El Niño southern oscillation (ENSO) cycle, with the largest events occurring after an interval of several years with no flowering.

Shorea spp. are insect pollinated. A variety of insects have been identified as pollinators, with species within the sections of Shorea sharing the same insect pollinators. Flowering within a section is sequential within one habitat and species association to prevent competition for pollinators.

Seed predation and mortality have an impact on the reproduction process of dipterocarps such as Shorea. In Singapore, crab-eating macaque and moth larvae are known seed predators.

Uses
Many economically important timber trees belong to Shorea. They are sold under various trade names including "lauan", "lawaan", "meranti", "seraya", "balau", "bangkirai", and "Philippine mahogany". (For a list of species associated with each name, see the article on Dipterocarp timber classification.) The "Philippine mahogany" sold in North America is not a true mahogany at all, but a mixture of woods from the genus Shorea.

Other products from Shorea spp. include dammar and illipe. Dammar is a resin collected from a variety of species. It varies in colour among the different taxonomic groups. Shorea wiesneri is listed in many websites as an important source of dammar; however, this appears to be either a trade name or a synonym.

Borneo tallow nut oil is extracted from the egg-shaped, winged fruit of Shorea species.

Conservation status
Of the 148 species of Shorea currently listed on the IUCN Redlist, most are listed as being critically endangered. Some concerns exist regarding the IUCN's listing of dipterocarps, as the criteria used to assess the level of threat are based mainly on animal population characteristics. This is thought to overstate the threat assessment, when applied to long-lived, habitat-specific organisms such as trees.  The Shorea species page gives threat classifications.

See also
Dipterocarp timber classification

References

External links
 
 

 
Malvales genera
Wood